Mount Holly is a small suburban city in northeastern Gaston County, North Carolina, United States. The city is situated just west of the Catawba River, north of Interstate 85, south of North Carolina State Highway 16, and west of Charlotte. The population was 17,703 at the 2020 census, up from 13,656 in 2010.

Geography
Mount Holly is located at  (35.295178, -81.019319).

History

Land grants were first issued in the Mount Holly area by King George II of Great Britain around 1750. In 1754, a land grant was issued to James Kuykendall of Holland in the locale known as Dutchman's Creek. Later in 1838, a post office in the area was named Woodlawn. In 1875, the name of the town was changed to Mount Holly, after the Mount Holly Cotton Mill that was started that year. The name "Mount Holly" was used in recognition of the famed yarn made at a spinning mill in Mount Holly, New Jersey.

A.P. and D.E. Rhyne and Ambrose Costner originally owned the Mount Holly Cotton Mill. It was the fourth mill to be built in Gaston County and is the oldest surviving mill today. The mill's success and the prosperity of the area as a whole led local residents to petition the North Carolina General Assembly for incorporation of Mount Holly in 1879.

The first railroad in Gaston County, the Carolina Central Railway, began serving Mount Holly in 1860. The line, which runs parallel with North Carolina State Highway 27, is still in service and operated by CSX. In 1911, construction began on the area's second railroad, the Piedmont and Northern Railway. On May 20, 1912, it made its first run from Charlotte to Gastonia.

Electricity became available to homes and businesses around the turn of the twentieth century. The Woodlawn Mill, located on Woodlawn Avenue, was built in 1906 and was the first mill in Gaston County to be served with electricity.

The Downtown Mount Holly Historic District and Mount Holly Cotton Mill are listed on the National Register of Historic Places.

Demographics

2020 census

As of the 2020 United States census, there were 17,703 people, 6,134 households, and 3,846 families residing in the city.

2000 census
As of the census of 2000, there were 9,618 people, 4,028 households, and 2,658 families residing in the city. The population density was 1,236.3 people per square mile (477.3/km2). There were 4,241 housing units at an average density of 545.2 per square mile (210.5/km2). The racial composition of the city in 2010 was: 76.3% White, 15.8% Black or African American, 2.60% Asian American, 7.3% Hispanic or Latino American, 0.1% Native American, 0.0% Native Hawaiian or Other Pacific Islander, 0.75% some other race, and 0.9% two or more races.

There were 4,028 households, out of which 29.5% had children under the age of 18 living with them, 47.1% were married couples living together, 14.0% had a female householder with no husband present, and 34.0% were non-families. 27.9% of all households were made up of individuals, and 10.2% had someone living alone who was 65 years of age or older. The average household size was 2.37 and the average family size was 2.89.

In the city, the population was spread out, with 23.4% under the age of 18, 8.4% from 18 to 24, 34.3% from 25 to 44, 20.6% from 45 to 64, and 13.3% who were 65 years of age or older. The median age was 35 years. For every 100 females, there were 92.6 males. For every 100 females age 18 and over, there were 88.4 males.

The median income for a household in the city was $39,459, and the median income for a family was $46,295. Males had a median income of $32,128 versus $23,965 for females. The per capita income for the city was $20,161. About 8.2% of families and 10.8% of the population were below the poverty line, including 16.5% of those under age 18 and 8.5% of those age 65 or over.

Government

The City of Mount Holly has a Council-Manager form of government with a mayor and six council members. The mayor is elected every four years in November, and the council members, elected at-large, serve four-year staggered terms. The city council appoints a professional city manager to run the day-to-day operations.

Education

Three elementary schools (Pinewood, Catawba Heights and Ida Rankin), Mount Holly Middle School, East Gaston High School and Stuart W. Cramer High School are the public schools that serve Mount Holly. All six schools are part of the Gaston County Schools. Mountain Island Charter School is also located near Mount Holly near Highway 16. Because of Mount Holly's location, residents there have access to a number of public and private colleges and universities, including Belmont Abbey College, Gaston College, Central Piedmont Community College, Queens University of Charlotte, Pfeiffer University, Johnson and Wales University, the University of North Carolina at Charlotte, and Johnson C. Smith University.

The Mount Holly Branch of the Gaston County Public Library serves this community.

Economy
Improvements in the regional transportation network and the economic growth of the Charlotte-Mecklenburg area, and Mount Holly's strategic location between Charlotte and Gastonia, have created conditions for an expanding population in recent years.

The textile industry continues to play a significant role in the Mount Holly area. The Gaston County Economic Development Commission's current manufacturing directory lists 19 manufacturing firms in the area, ten of which are textile related. The city's largest textile firm is American & Efird, Inc. (A&E), the world's second-largest thread maker. The firm was created with a 1952 merger of American Yarn and Processing Company (located in Mount Holly) and the Efird Manufacturing Company (located in Albemarle, North Carolina). American Yarn had its start in 1891 when Charles Egbert Hutchison founded the Nims Manufacturing Company on Dutchman's Creek. With six plants and their corporate offices in Mount Holly, A&E employs more than 980 people and maintains a strong presence in the community. 
In 1990, the Freightliner Trucks manufacturing plant was annexed into the city. Freightliner and its subsidiary businesses have been a significant employer in Mount Holly since 1979.

Since 2007 National Gypsum has operated a wallboard plant in Mount Holly. While gypsum wallboard is typically produced from gypsum rock, the Mount Holly plant uses byproduct gypsum produced by sulfur dioxide scrubbers at four of Duke Power's coal-fired power plants.

Mount Holly's historic downtown district includes several restaurants, a coffee shop, salons and retail offerings in addition to offices, banks and other businesses.

References

External links
 City of Mount Holly official website
 Mount Holly Community Development Foundation
 Gaston Regional Chamber
 Montcross Area Chamber of Commerce
https://www.gaston.k12.nc.us/mtholly

Cities in North Carolina
Cities in Gaston County, North Carolina
Populated places established in 1838
1838 establishments in North Carolina
North Carolina populated places on the Catawba River